30 Inolvidables is a 2003 compilation album series:

30 Inolvidables (Los Bukis album)
30 Inolvidables, by Grupo Bronco
30 Inolvidables, by Los Cadetes de Linares
30 Inolvidables, by José María Napoleón
30 Inolvidables, by Rigo Tovar
30 Inolvidables, by Los Freddy's